Castro Synagogue is a synagogue in Alexandria, Egypt in the Moharam Bey district that was the home of many wealthy Jewish families. It was built in 1920.

See also
History of the Jews in Egypt
List of synagogues in Egypt

References 

Synagogues in Alexandria
Synagogues completed in 1920
1920 establishments in Egypt
20th-century religious buildings and structures in Egypt